Frederick "Fred" Brown (birth unknown – death unknown) was a Welsh professional rugby league footballer who played in the 1920s.

Playing career

International honours
Fred Brown won caps for Wales while at Oldham 1921–1923 2-caps.

Championship final appearances
Fred Brown played left-, i.e. number 8, in Oldham's 2-13 defeat by Wigan in the Championship Final during the 1921–22 season at The Cliff, Broughton on Saturday 6 May 1922.

County League appearances
Fred Brown played in Wigan's victory in the Lancashire County League during the 1923–24.

Challenge Cup Final appearances
Fred Brown played left-, i.e. number 11, in Wigan's 21-4 victory over Oldham in the 1924 Challenge Cup Final during the 1923–24 season at Athletic Grounds, Rochdale on Saturday 12 April 1924.

References

External links
(archived by web.archive.org) Statistics at orl-heritagetrust.org.uk
Statistics at wigan.rlfans.com

Oldham R.L.F.C. players
Place of birth missing
Place of death missing
Rugby league props
Rugby league second-rows
Wales national rugby league team players
Welsh rugby league players
Wigan Warriors players
Year of birth missing
Year of death missing